Khalil Sara (also Romanized as Khalīl Sarā) is a village in Gasht Rural District, in the Central District of Fuman County, Gilan Province, Iran. At the 2006 census, its population was 367, in 99 families.

References 

Populated places in Fuman County